Pasquotank Correctional Institution is a state prison in Elizabeth City, North Carolina.

Overview

Notable incidents

2017 Escape Attempt
On October 12th 2017, four inmates attempted to escape from the facility in the deadliest escape attempt in North Carolina history.  The four inmates used tools gathered from the prison's sewing factory to kill four facility employees.

Notable inmates

References

Prisons in North Carolina